Actinoseris is a genus of flowering plants in the daisy family described as a genus in 1970.

There is only one accepted species, Actinoseris radiata, native to Brazil.

References

Monotypic Asteraceae genera
Flora of Brazil
Taxa named by Ángel Lulio Cabrera